Murray Seldeen (November 9, 1904 – December 10, 1987) was an American film editor.

Selected filmography
 The Texan (1932)
 One Exciting Adventure (1934)
 It Happened in New York  (1935)
 Navy Blues (1937)
 Hit the Saddle (1937)
 Romance on the Run (1938)
 Storm Over Bengal (1938)
 Woman Doctor (1939)
 Hit Parade of 1941 (1940)

References

Bibliography
  Allan R. Ellenberger. Ramon Novarro: A Biography of the Silent Film Idol, 1899-1968; With a Filmography. McFarland, 1999.

External links

1904 births
1987 deaths
American film editors